Wildest Dreams is a British television programme presented by Nick Knowles and starring James Honeyborne. Seven episodes were first broadcast on BBC One in 2009.

External links
 

BBC Television shows
2009 British television series debuts
2009 British television series endings